Funke is a family name of German origin. Funke means "spark" and refers to the work of a smith. People with this surname include:

 Alex Funke (b. 1944), American photographer
 Annie Funke (b. 1985), American actress
 Arno Funke (b. 1950), German author and former extortionist
 Cornelia Funke (b. 1958), German author of children's books
 Daniel Funke (b. 1981), German journalist
 Ernst Funke (1835–1906), American politician and businessman
 Fabian Funke (born 1997), German politician
 Felix Funke (1865–1932), German admiral of the Kaiserliche Marine
 Helene Funke (1869–1957), German painter
 Jan-Lukas Funke (b. 1999), German footballer
 Jaromír Funke (1896–1945), Czech photographer
 Jeffrey J. Funke (b. 1969), American judge
 Karl-Heinz Funke (b. 1942), German politician (SPD)
 Lars Funke (b. 1972), German speed skater
 Manfred Funke (b. 1955), German weightlifter
 Michael Funke (b. 1969), German racing driver
 Otto Funke (1928–1879), German physiologist
 Peter Funke (b. 1950), German historian
 Rainer Funke (b. 1940), German politician
 Rich Funke (b. 1949), American journalist and politician
 Sabine Funke (b. 1955), German artist
 Ursula Funke (1939–2020), German politician

See also
Funk

References

German-language surnames